Jacob Querido (‘the Beloved’, ca. 1650–1690, Alexandria, Egypt) was the successor of the self-proclaimed Jewish Messiah Sabbatai Zevi. Born in Thessaloniki, he was the son of Joseph the Philosopher and brother of Jochebed, Shabbatai Zevi's last wife. Jochebed (also called ‘Ā’ishah following her conversion to Islam) claimed that he was the reincarnation of her late spouse, so that he might succeed to the leadership of Sabbatai's followers. He attracted a considerable following of his own, called Ya‘qōviyīm or Yakubiler.

Querido converted to Islam taking his name as Yakup in 1687 and playing an important role in the Dönmeh. He led his disciples on a pilgrimage to Mecca. He died in Alexandria on his way back.

Notes

References

1650s births
1690 deaths
Jews from Thessaloniki
Converts to Islam from Judaism
Sabbateans
Jewish messiah claimants
17th-century Sephardi Jews